Ardyaloon or One Arm Point, also known as Bardi, is an Aboriginal Australian community town on the Dampier Peninsula, in the Kimberley region of Western Australia.

The Bardi Ardyaloon hatchery has successfully produced trochus shell at One Arm Point for a number of years, including reseeding the reef surrounding the area.

The area is home to the Bardi people.

According to the local Indigenous people, the name "One Arm Point" originated from the tale of an unfortunate pearler who had an accident with dynamite while attempting to catch fish using explosives in the bay.

Native title
The community is located within the Bardi Jawi native title determination area, determined by the Federal Court of Australia on 30 November 2005. (Federal Court file nos. WAD49/1998, WAD6001/2004)  It is managed through its incorporated body, Ardyaloon Incorporated, registered under the Associations Incorporations Act 1987 and the Aboriginal Communities Act 1979.

The town plan follows the Ardyaloon Community Layout Plan No.2 has been prepared in accordance with State Planning Strategy 3.2 Aboriginal Settlements. Layout Plan No.2 was endorsed by the community on 15 September 2004 and the Western Australia Planning Commission on 15 February 2005, with various amendments up until 2017.

Town planning
Ardyaloon Layout Plan No.2 was prepared in accordance with State Planning Policy 3.2 and was endorsed by the community in 2004 and the Western Australian Planning Commission in 2005.

See also
List of Aboriginal communities in Western Australia

References

External links
 National Native Title Register Details
 Department of Planning Document 1, confirming name of town.

Towns in Western Australia
Aboriginal communities in Kimberley (Western Australia)